Elizabeth Anne McMahan (1924–2009), known as Betty, was a Professor in the Department of Biology at the University of North Carolina, Chapel Hill for 26 years. She had a distinguished and varied career as an entomologist, psychologist, cartoonist, writer of children's books, and world traveler.  She worked in the parapsychology lab of J. B. Rhine at Duke for several years, but left for graduate work in entomology at the University of Hawaii and subsequent research on the feeding, foraging, and social behavior of termites and some of their associate and predator species. Her field work in entomology took her to Puerto Rico, Costa Rica, Panama, Venezuela, Ecuador, Australia, and India.  Two insect species were named for her: the assassin bug Salyavata mcmahanae and the beetle Neophilotermes mcmahanae.

Selected publications

Entomology
McMahan, E.A. (1996) "Termites", in The Food Web of a Tropical Rain Forest, Ed D.P. Reagan & R.B. Wade, University of Chicago Press, pp. 110–135
Jones, S.C., Nalepa, C.A., McMahan E.A., Torres, J.A. (1995) "Survey and ecological studies of the termites (Isoptera:Kalotermitidae) of Mona Island", Florida Entomologist 78: 305–313
McMahan, E,A. (1986) "Beneficial aspects of termites", in Economic Impacts and Control of Social Insects, Ed S.B. Vinson, Praeger Press, pp. 144–164
McMahan, E.A. (1983) "Adaptations, feeding preferences, and biometrics of a termite-baiting assassin bug (Hemiptera, Reduviidae)", Annals of the Entomological Society of America 76: 483–486
McMahan, E.A. (1970) "Polyethism in workers of Nasutitermes costalis (Holmgren)", Insectes Sociaux, 17: 113–120
McMahan, E.A. (1963) "A study of termite feeding relationships, Using radioisotopes", Annals of the Entomological Society of America 58: 74–82
McMahan, E.A. (1962) "Laboratory studies of colony establishment and development in Cryptotermes brevis(Walker) (Isoptera: Kalotermitidae)", Proceedings of the Hawaiian Entomological Society 18: 145–153
McMagan, E.A., Gray I.E. (1957) "Variation in a local population of the dragonfly Helocordulia", Annals of the Entomological Society of America 50: 62–66

Entomology, for the layman
McMahan, E.A. (2005) "Adventures documenting an assassin bug that "fishes" for termites", American Entomologist 51: 202–207
McMahan, E.A. (1983) "Bugs angle for termites", Natural History Magazine 92: 40–47

Parapsychology
McMahan, E.A. (1947) "A review of the evidence for dowsing", Journal of Parapsychology 11: 175-?
McMahan, E.A. (1946) "An experiment in pure telepathy", Journal of Parapsychology 10: 224-?

Children's books
McMahan, E.A. (2000) Cammie, A Girl for All Seasons
McMahan, E.A. (2001) Raising Cane with Cammie
McMahan, E.A. (2002) Cammie Turns Ten,

References 

1924 births
2009 deaths
Women entomologists
American entomologists
Parapsychologists
University of North Carolina at Chapel Hill faculty
University of Hawaiʻi alumni
Duke University Trinity College of Arts and Sciences alumni
Appalachian State University alumni
People from Davie County, North Carolina
American children's writers
American women children's writers
Scientists from North Carolina
20th-century American zoologists
20th-century American women scientists
American women academics